Minersville Coke Ovens is a historic set of coke oven site located at Carbon Township in Huntingdon County, Pennsylvania. The property includes the remains of beehive and Mitchell coke ovens, the pillars and remains of the tipple, the foundation remains of the supply house, engine and power house, substation and hoist house, blacksmith and machine shop, railroad rights of way and the Gordon Mine. In 1925, the property had 90 beehive ovens and 67 uncompleted Mitchell ovens.

It was listed on the National Register of Historic Places in 1990.

References 

Coke ovens
Blacksmith shops
Industrial buildings and structures on the National Register of Historic Places in Pennsylvania
Industrial buildings completed in 1875
Buildings and structures in Huntingdon County, Pennsylvania
National Register of Historic Places in Huntingdon County, Pennsylvania
1875 establishments in Pennsylvania